Ophiocordyceps macroacicularis is an entomopathogenic fungus belonging to the order Hypocreales (Ascomycota) in the family Ophiocordycipitaceae, which parasitize moth larvae. It produces superficial, oval perithecia at the apex of its stroma, and also multiseptate ascospores, while producing Hirsutella-type anamorphs on growth culture media. They are particularly distinguished by the size and shape of their stromata.

References

Further reading
 Araújo, João, et al. "Unravelling the diversity behind Ophiocordyceps unilateralis complex: Three new species of Zombie-Ant fungus from Brazilian Amazon." bioRxiv (2014): 003806.

External links
 

Diseases of Lepidopterans
Animal fungal diseases
Fungi described in 2014
Ophiocordycipitaceae